The 2010 Africa Cup of Nations Final was a football match that took place on 31 January 2010 at the Estádio 11 de Novembro in Luanda, Angola, to determine the winner of the 2010 Africa Cup of Nations, the football championship of Africa organized by the Confederation of African Football (CAF).

It was contested by Ghana and Egypt.

Egypt won the title for the seventh time by beating Ghana 1–0.

Route to the final

Match details

Details

References

Final
2010
African
African
21st century in Luanda
Sports competitions in Luanda
 
 
January 2010 sports events in Africa